Mehdi Gharbi (born 5 February 1999) is a Tunisian sailor. He competed in the Nacra 17 event at the 2020 Summer Olympics. His father Hedi represented Tunisia in sailing at the 2016 Summer Olympics.

References

External links
 
 

1999 births
Living people
Tunisian male sailors (sport)
Olympic sailors of Tunisia
Sailors at the 2020 Summer Olympics – Nacra 17
Place of birth missing (living people)
21st-century Tunisian people